In computing, Posadis is a GPL-licensed DNS server for Microsoft Windows and Unix that uses a zone file format that is compatible with BIND zone files. Posadis is part of a suite which includes graphical configuration and zone file management programs.

Posadis has IPv6 support.

See also

Comparison of DNS server software

External links
 Posadis website
 

DNS software
Cross-platform free software
Free network-related software
DNS server software for Linux